Jayappaji Rao Shinde (Sindhia, Shinde) (c. 1720 - 25 July 1755) also known as Jayappa Dadasahib, was a Maratha general. He ruled Gwalior State in northern India from 1745 to 1755, succeeding his father Ranoji Rao Scindia who had founded it.

He was killed by two men named Khokar Kesar Khan and Shri Kan Singh ji, who were adherents of Maharaja Vijay Singh of Jodhpur before the walls of Nagaur in Rajasthan on 25 July 1755, after entanglement in the affairs of Jodhpur

He was succeeded by his son Jankoji Rao Scindia, who was killed at the Third Battle of Panipat in 1761.

Jayappa had four daughters who married in the knight families of Shinde, including one in Nimbalkar, two in Ghorpade and last one in the house of Savant - Bhonsle family. Jankoji Shinde married Kashibai Nimbalkar, sister of Vyankatrao and Janrao Nimbalkar of Phaltan, both Sardars of the Nizam of Hyderabad, hailing from Phaltan.

See also
Scindia

References

1720 births
1755 deaths
Indian generals

Japayyapaji